Michel Morandais (born 10 January 1979) is a French former professional basketball player.

College career
After playing with the youth teams of the French club Levallois Sporting Club, Morandais played college basketball in the United States, with the Colorado Buffaloes, of the Pac-12 Conference.

Professional career
After not being selected in the 2004 NBA draft, Morandais signed with Italian League club Cantù. From 2004 to 2008, Morandais spent time with four clubs in Italy and Spain, including Barcelona Basket of the Spanish ACB League. He was selected to the Italian LBA league's All-Star Game. 

In 2008, he joined the French League club SLUC Nancy. While with the French club Champagne Châlons-Reims, Morandais was named the French 2nd Division French Player's MVP, in 2014. He finished his pro club career playing with the French club ASVEL.

National team career
Morandais played with the senior French national team in 10 games.

References

External links 
EuroLeague Profile
Colorado Buffaloes College Profile

1979 births
Living people
ASVEL Basket players
CB Estudiantes players
Champagne Châlons-Reims Basket players
Colorado Buffaloes men's basketball players
FC Barcelona Bàsquet players
French expatriate basketball people in Spain
French expatriate basketball people in the United States
French expatriate sportspeople in Italy
French men's basketball players
Liga ACB players
Pallacanestro Cantù players
Pallacanestro Varese players
Shooting guards
SLUC Nancy Basket players
Small forwards